Delimobil is one of the largest carsharing organizations in Russia, with a fleet of over 18,000 vehicles and more than 7.1 million members. Its vehicle park consists of Hyundai Solaris, Renault Kaptur, Volkswagen Polo and since October 2021 also Toyota Rav4. Delimobil's carsharing service is available in Moscow, Saint-Petersburg, Nizhny Novgorod, Yekaterinburg, Samara, Kazan, Novosibirsk, Krasnodar and Tula.

History 
The company was founded in 2015 with a fleet of 100 cars in Moscow.

As of October 2021, Delimobil has more than 18,000 cars in Moscow and 11 cities in Russia. In the same month, Delimobil has filed documents with the U.S. Securities and Exchange Commission for an IPO on the New York Stock Exchange.

In November 2021, IPO of Delimobil Holding S.A. at NYSE took more time than previewed (finalization of public stock offering has been expected in the evening of the 2nd of November) because of negotiations with supplementary investors. The car sharing company is also intends for IPO at Moscow Exchange, conforming application been submitted on November, 1st. The day after these news, the IPO has been postponed without any precise date due to market conditions despite investor's warm.

See also 
 Carsharing in Moscow
 Vincenzo Trani

References

External links 
 Official website

Carsharing
Service companies of Russia
Companies based in Moscow
2015 establishments in Russia